"I'm Raving" is a song by German group Scooter. It was released in September 1996 as the lead single from their album Wicked!. The song is based on the 1992 Shut Up and Dance track "Raving I'm Raving", which is itself based significantly on the 1991 single "Walking in Memphis" by Marc Cohn. Several lyrics were altered including the line "I'm walking in Memphis" becoming "I'm raving, I'm raving".

The song features a sample of the Scottish traditional song "Scotland the Brave".

Music video
The music video for "I'm Raving" was directed by Rainer Thieding.

Track listing
CD-maxi 
 "I'm Raving" - 3:36
 "I'm Raving" (Extended) - 5:06
 "B-Site" (www.Mix) - 5:35
 "Loops and Pipes" - 1:22

CD-maxi (The Remixes)

 "I'm Raving" (Progressive Remix) - 7:22
 "I'm Raving" (Taucher Remix) - 9:44
 "I'm Raving" (Fortunato & Montresor House Remix) - 7:59
 "I'm Raving" (DB 600 Remix) - 4:49

Charts

Weekly charts

Year-end charts

Certifications

References

Techno songs
Scooter (band) songs
1996 singles
1996 songs
Black-and-white music videos
Music videos directed by Rainer Thieding
Songs written by Marc Cohn